Jekalyn Almonique Carr (born April 22, 1997) is a recording artist, as well as a speaker, entrepreneur, actress, and author.

As a top selling recording artist, Carr has earned eight Billboard #1’s before the age of 21, including singles, “You’re Bigger” and “You Will Win”  She was nominated for a Grammy for Best Gospel Album in 2021/22.

Early life 
Jekalyn Almonique Carr was born on April 22, 1997 to Jennifer Denise Carr and Allen Lindsey Carr in Arkansas. Jekalyn has two siblings: Allen Lindsey Carr Jr. and Allundria Carr.

At 5 years old, Carr began serving in her church's choir and was noted by her family to have a decent ear for music. Carr taught herself how to sing and became a main chorister in her neighborhood church.

After some time, Carr’s singing ability continued to develop and age 11 she was called to serve in melodies and inspirational words to the general population.

Music career 

At the age of 15, her speaking shifted to music when her single “Greater Is Coming” debuted on Billboard’s Gospel Music Top Ten.

Carr received her first Stellar Award at the age of 16. In 2021, Carr became the first gospel artist to be inducted into the Women’s Songwriters Hall of Fame and in 2022, she received the Lifetime Achievement Award from President Joe Biden.

Discography

Albums

Studio albums
Promise (2011), Independent
Greater is Coming (2013), Lunjeal
It's Gonna Happen (2014), Lunjeal
The Life Project (2016), Lunjeal
One Nation Under God (2018), Lunjeal
Changing Your Story (2020), Lunjeal

Singles

As lead artist
"Greater Is Coming" (2012)
"Something Big" (2014)
"You're Bigger" (2016)
"You Will Win" (2017)
"I See Miracles" (2019)
"Changing Your Story" (2020)
"My Portion" (2021)
"New Day" (2022)
"Great Christmas" (2022)
"I Believe God" (2023)

As featured artist
"Mean Girls" (Leanna Crawford featuring Jekalyn Carr) (2021)

Published works
You Will Win (2018)

References

External links
 Official website
 Cross Rhythms artist profile

1997 births
Living people
African-American women singer-songwriters
African-American Christians
American child singers
American gospel singers
Singer-songwriters from Arkansas
21st-century African-American women singers